The communauté de communes de Samer et environs was located in the Pas-de-Calais département in northern France. It was created in January 2002. It was merged into the new Communauté de communes de Desvres-Samer in January 2009.

The Communauté de communes comprised the following communes:
Carly 
Halinghen  
Lacres 
Questrecques  
Samer  
Tingry  
Verlincthun 
Wierre-au-Bois

References 

Samer et environs